This is a list of the German Media Control Top100 Singles Chart number-ones of 1981.

Best performing album

See also
List of number-one hits (Germany)

References

 German Singles Chart Archives from 1956
 Media Control Chart Archives from 1960

1981 in Germany
1981 record charts
1981